Ostrów Grabowski  (pronounced ) is a little island on Oder River in Poland, which is placed in Szczecin. The surface of it is approaching 175 ha. Ostrów Grabowski is surrounded by Odra and Duńczyca.

Islands of Poland
Szczecin